The South African Under-19 cricket team have been playing official Under-19 test matches since 1995. International players to have represented the team include Wayne Parnell, Neil McKenzie, AB de Villiers, Mark Boucher, Makhaya Ntini, Kagiso Rabada, Andile Phehlukwayo and  Aiden Markram. They won the Under-19 Cricket World Cup in 2014 and finished runner-up in both 2002 and 2008.

In February 2021, Cricket South Africa (CSA) announced that the team would take part in South Africa's Provincial first-class and List A cricket tournaments, starting with the 2020–21 CSA 3-Day Provincial Cup and the 2020–21 CSA Provincial One-Day Challenge respectively. However, the matches played by the under-19 team in those tournaments did not have first-class or List A status.

Under-19 World Cup record

Current squad
The South African squad for the 2016 Under-19 Cricket World Cup, as announced on 21 December 2015, was as follows:

References

External links
England Under-19s in South Africa 2008/09 - South Africa Squad

Under-19 cricket teams
U
C